Heteroponera microps is a species of ant in the genus Heteroponera. Endemic to South America, it was described by Borgmeier in 1957.

References

External links

Heteroponerinae
Hymenoptera of South America
Insects described in 1957